Give Me Your Heart may refer to:

Songs
"Give Me Your Heart" (Bloodstone song), 1975
"Give Me Your Heart" (Romeo song), 2012
"Give Me Your Heart", by Backstreet Boys, a B-side of the single "Quit Playing Games (With My Heart)", 1996
"Give Me Your Heart", by John Pizzarelli from New Standards, 1994

Other uses
Give Me Your Heart (film), a 1936 American film directed by Archie Mayo
Give Me Your Heart: Tales of Mystery and Suspense, a 2011 short story collection by Joyce Carol Oates